Indermit Gill is an Indian Economist who as worked on economic growth, poverty, institutions, conflict, and climate change.
He is the World Bank Group's Chief Economist of the World Bank Group and also their Senior Vice President for Development Economics. He has previously worked at Duke University, the Brookings Institution, Georgetown University and the University of Chicago. His Ph.D. was awarded by the University of Chicago.

Selected publications
 Gill, I. S., & Kharas, H. (2015). The middle-income trap turns ten. World Bank Policy Research Working Paper, (7403).
 Gill, I. S., Kharas, H. J., & Bhattasali, D. (2007). An East Asian renaissance: Ideas for economic growth. World Bank Publications.

References

20th-century Indian economists
21st-century Indian economists
Year of birth missing (living people)
Living people